Marysville Mountain View Arts and Technology High School, located in Marysville, Washington, USA.Mountain View Arts and Technology High School was a public secondary school for grades 9-12 and is part of the Marysville School District.  School days are organized into seven periods.

MMVAT Graduation requirements
A & T offers a four-year program of study in core academic areas: Humanities, History, Arts, Math,
Science, Business, and Technology. All Program requirements and Portfolio, must be met in order for
a student to receive an Arts & Technology diploma. Students must pass the State Transition Graduation
Assessment at proficient levels in reading and writing. Students must also meet End Of Course (EOC)
and Smarter Balance Testing standards.

Note:
23.00 Credits are required to graduate for 2016, 2017, 2018
24:00 Credits are required to graduate for 2019
Semester credit =.5
One year credit = 1.0
24 credits are possible for a full-time student; but only 23/24 are required for graduation in order to allow for
extenuating circumstances.

Required Courses: English, History, Social Studies, Math, Science, Physical Education, Art, CTE (Career
Technology Ed) and Electives.

References

History of Marysville Arts and Technology High School: History, development and first year of this new Marysville school.
History of Marysville Arts and Technology High School: History, development and first year of this new Marysville school.. (2017). 
writingachievement.com. Retrieved 28 February 2017, from http://www.writingachievement.com/MarysvilleAandT.htm 

A&T Student Handbook
A&T Student Handbook (2017). 
Msd25.org. 
Retrieved 28 February 2017, from http://www.msd25.org/cms/lib8/WA01918994/Centricity/Domain/1016/15_Arts%20and%20Tech%20Student%20Handbook.pdf

Meet our principal
Meet our principal (2017).
Msd25.org.
Retrieved 29 August 2017, from http://www.msd25.org/o/arts-and-technology-high-school/page/meet-our-principal--17

External links
Arts and Technology High School website
Marysville School District website

High schools in Snohomish County, Washington
Marysville, Washington
Public high schools in Washington (state)